The Municipality of Podvelka is a municipality in the traditional region of Styria in northern Slovenia. The seat of the municipality is the town of Podvelka. The Municipality of Podvelka–Ribnica was created in 1994, and it then split into the Municipality of Ribnica na Pohorju and the Municipality of Podvelka in 1998.

Settlements
In addition to the municipal seat of Podvelka, the municipality also includes the following settlements:

 Brezno
 Janževski Vrh
 Javnik
 Kozji Vrh
 Lehen na Pohorju
 Ožbalt
 Rdeči Breg
 Spodnja Kapla
 Vurmat
 Zgornja Kapla

References

External links

Municipality of Podvelka on Geopedia
Municipality of Podvelka website

Podvelka
1998 establishments in Slovenia